East Community High School is a high school located in the East Side of Buffalo, New York. It serves 190 students in Grades 9-12. The current principal is Traci Cofield.

History 
East Community High School opened in 2016, replacing East High School, which was phased out due to persistently low academic performance and closed in 2018.

Former principal 
Previous assignment and reason for departure denoted in parentheses
Darryl A. King–2016-2019 (Assistant Principal - Math, Science, Technology Preparatory School, resigned)

Academics 
East Community High School offers career and technical education programs in law enforcement, firefighting, forensics, and legal studies. The building serves as a community school for the greater East Side, offering community and family educational programs after school hours and on selected weekends.

References

External links 

2016 establishments in New York (state)
Educational institutions established in 2016
High schools in Buffalo, New York
Public high schools in New York (state)